Iain Andrew Cook (born 2 November 1974) is a Scottish musician, composer, record producer, and member of Glasgow-based pop band Chvrches. He played guitar for the Scottish post-rock band Aereogramme until their breakup in 2007. Cook also composes music for film and television and is a member of the rock band The Unwinding Hours.

Biography
Prior to the formation of Aereogramme, Cook, who was using the alias Johnny Dymes, was a member of Les Tinglies. In 1998, Cook founded Aereogramme with Craig B., Campbell McNeil and Martin Scott. The band released their debut album A Story in White in 2001, through Chemikal Underground record label. The band's second album, Sleep and Release (2003) was followed by Seclusion in (2004). The band released their last album, My Heart Has a Wish That You Would Not Go in 2007 and disbanded at the same year.

Cook wrote the theme tune for One Life Left, the long running videogame radio show which began in 2006.

In October 2022, Cook unveiled a new side project called Projection with from Sons and Daughters guitarist Scott Paterson.

Personal life
One of his favourite video game series is Final Fantasy. He lives in Glasgow with his partner, actress Morven Christie.

Discography
With Aereogramme

 A Story in White (2001)
 Sleep and Release (2003)
 Seclusion (2004)
 My Heart Has a Wish That You Would Not Go (2007)

With The Unwinding Hours
 The Unwinding Hours (2010)
 Afterlives (2012)
With Chvrches

 The Bones of What You Believe (2013)
 Every Open Eye (2015)
 Love Is Dead (2018)
 Screen Violence (2021)

As Producer
 Traces by Karine Polwart (2012)

References

External links
 
 

Scottish male guitarists
Male bass guitarists
1974 births
Living people
Scottish keyboardists
Scottish electronic musicians
Scottish bass guitarists
Scottish record producers
21st-century bass guitarists
21st-century British male musicians